Essex South was a constituency of the European Parliament located in the United Kingdom, electing one member of the European Parliament by the first-past-the-post electoral system. Created in 1994 from parts of Essex South West and Essex North East, it was abolished in 1999 on the adoption of proportional representation for European elections in the United Kingdom. It was succeeded by the East of England region.

Boundaries

It consisted of the parliamentary constituencies of Basildon, Billericay, Castle Point, Rochford, Southend East, Southend West and Thurrock. Basildon, Billericay and Thurrock had previously been part of Essex South West while Castle Point, Southend East, Southend West and much of Rochford had been part of Essex North East.

The entire area became part of the East of England constituency in 1999.

MEPs

Election results

References

External links
 David Boothroyd's United Kingdom Election Results 

European Parliament constituencies in England (1979–1999)
Politics of Essex
1994 establishments in England
1999 disestablishments in England
Constituencies established in 1994
Constituencies disestablished in 1999